The Poison: Live at Brixton is a DVD released on 30 October 2006 in the United Kingdom and was released on 19 December 2006 in the United States. The DVD is of Bullet for My Valentine performing live at the Brixton Academy on 28 January 2006, shortly before frontman Matt Tuck began to experience throat and vocals problems. It was released in Japan as a CD/DVD box. The CD included the complete concert at Brixton as an audio.
In 2017, the band released Live From Brixton Chapter Two, a two-night performance celebrating the tenth anniversary of their first album The Poison.

Track listing
Concert
 "Intro"
 "Her Voice Resides"
 "4 Words (To Choke Upon)"
 "Suffocating Under Words of Sorrow (What Can I Do)"
 "All These Things I Hate (Revolve Around Me)"
 "The Poison"
 "Spit You Out"
 "Cries in Vain"
 "Just Another Star"
 "Tears Don't Fall"
 "No Control"
 "Hand of Blood"
 "The End"

Music videos
 "Hand of Blood"
 "4 Words (To Choke Upon)"
 "Suffocating Under Words of Sorrow (What Can I Do)"
 "All These Things I Hate (Revolve Around Me)"
 "Tears Don't Fall"

Documentaries
 Behind the scenes at Brixton Academy
 Mullet's Here
 Download and Dirty
 Spit or Swallow
 Spot the Gimp
 Motherland
 The Bucket

Bullet TV
 Introduction
 Backstage Entrance
 Night Out Part 1
 Night Out Part 2
 The Tour Bus Part 1
 The Tour Bus Part 2
 Video Shoot Part 1
 Video Shoot Part 2/The End

Personnel
 Matt Tuck – vocals, rhythm guitar, solo on tracks 3 and 4, second solo on track 10
 Micheal "Padge" Paget – lead guitar, backing vocals
 Michael "Moose" Thomas – drums
 Jay James – bass, vocals

Crew
 Tour Manager - George Davidson
 Guitar Technician - Kevin Papworth
 Drum Technician - Will Clark
 Lighting Designer - Ben Wingrove
 Monitors - Ian "Mole" Ettridge
 Sound Engineer - Clem Bennett

Certifications

References

2006 video albums
Bullet for My Valentine albums
Albums recorded at the Brixton Academy